The Florida Gators baseball team represents the University of Florida located in Gainesville, Florida. The Gators compete in Division I of the National Collegiate Athletics Association (NCAA) and the Eastern Division of the Southeastern Conference (SEC).

This is a list of Florida Gators baseball seasons that presents the season-by-season win–loss records of the Gators baseball team from its founding in 1912 to the present, including NCAA Tournament records.

Season results

References

 
Florida Gators
Florida Gators baseball seasons